Samuel Elbert may refer to:
 Samuel Elbert (1740–1788), American officer in the Revolutionary War, governor of Georgia, and merchant
 Samuel A. Elbert (1832–1902), American physician and political candidate in Indiana
 Samuel Hitt Elbert (1833–1899), governor of the Territory of Colorado
 Samuel Hoyt Elbert (1907–1997), American linguist